The men's 3000 metres at the 2022 World Athletics U20 Championships was held at the Estadio Olímpico Pascual Guerrero in Cali, Colombia on 3 and 5 August 2022.

42 athletes from 28 countries were originally entered to the competition, however, 34 of them competed.

Records
U20 standing records prior to the 2022 World Athletics U20 Championships were as follows:

Results

Round 1
The round 1 took place on 3 August, with the 34 athletes involved being splitted into 2 heats of 17 athletes each. The first 6 athletes in each heat ( Q ) and the next 3 fastest ( q ) qualified to the final. The overall results were as follows:

Final
The final was started at 17:04 on 5 August.

References

3000 metres
Long distance running at the World Athletics U20 Championships